H.O.T. TV: Hindi Ordinaryong Tsismis is a Philippine television magazine talk show broadcast by GMA Network. Directed by Rico Gutierrrez. it was hosted by Regine Velasquez, Roderick Paulate, Raymond Gutierrez and Jennylyn Mercado, It premiered on August 5, 2012 replacing Showbiz Central. The show concluded on April 28, 2013 with a total of 39 episodes. It was replaced by GMA Blockbusters in its timeslot.

Ratings

According to AGB Nielsen Philippines' Mega Manila household television ratings, the pilot episode of H.O.T. TV: Hindi Ordinaryong Tsismis earned a 12.4% rating. While the final episode scored a 6.8% rating.

Accolades

References

External links
 

2012 Philippine television series debuts
2013 Philippine television series endings
Entertainment news shows in the Philippines
Filipino-language television shows
GMA Network original programming
Philippine television talk shows